Javier Martín de Villa  (born 23 August 1981) is a Spanish ski mountaineer.

Martín was born in Madrid. He started ski mountaineering in 1998, competed first in the Trofeo Altos Pirineos race and became a member of the national team in the same year. He is also a member of the Dynafit team.

Selected results 
 2001:
 7th, European Championship "juniors" class team race (together with Arnau Anguera)
 2002:
 8th, World Championship "espoirs" class single race
 8th, Spanish Cup "espoirs" class single
 2003:
 1st, Spanish Cup "espoirs" class single
 1st, Spanish Championship "espoirs" class single
 3rd, Spanish Cup "espoirs" class team (together with Germán Cerezo)
 3rd, European Cup "espoirs" class single
 2004:
 1st, Spanish Cup "espoirs" class
 1st, Spanish Championship "espoirs" class team
 1st, Open Internacional, San Carlos de Bariloche
 2nd, World Championship "espoirs" class single race
 2nd, Spanish Championship "espoirs" class single
 4th, World Championship relay race ("seniors" ranking, together with Agustí Roc Amador, Dani León Roca and Manuel Pérez Brunicardi)
 5th, Spanish Cup
 10th, World Championship vertical race ("seniors" ranking)
 2005:
 6th, European Championship relay race (together with Manuel Pérez Brunicardi, Germán Cerezo Alonso and Fernando Navarro Aznar)
 8th, Spanish Cup
 10th, World Cup team (together with Manuel Pérez Brunicardi)
 2006:
 4th,Spanish Championship single
 6th, World Championship relay race (together with Federico Galera Díez, Manuel Pérez Brunicardi and Agustí Roc Amador)
 2007:
 2nd, Andalusian Championship single
 4th, European Championship relay race (together with Agustí Roc Amador, Marc Solá Pastoret and Manuel Pérez Brunicardi)
 10th, European Championship vertical race
 10th, European Championship single race
 2008:
 3rd, World Championship relay race (together with Kílian Jornet Burgada, Marc Solá Pastoret and Manuel Pérez Brunicardi)
 5th, World Championship team race (together with Jordi Bes Ginesta)
 7th, World Championship combination ranking
 2009:
 2nd, European Championship relay race (together with Kílian Jornet Burgada, Manuel Pérez Brunicardi and Joan Maria Vendrell Martínez)
 4th, European Championship combination ranking
 5th, European Championship single race
 5th, European Championship team race (together with Kílian Jornet Burgada)
 7th, European Championship vertical race
 2010:
 4th, World Championship relay race (together with Manuel Pérez Brunicardi, Marc Pinsach Rubirola and Kílian Jornet Burgada)
 2011:
 4th, World Championship relay, together with Marc Pinsach Rubirola, Kílian Jornet Burgada and Miguel Caballero Ortega

Pierra Menta 

 2010: 8th, Pierra Menta together with Marc Pinsach Rubirola

Patrouille des Glaciers 

 2010: 2nd ("seniors II" ranking), together with Benedikt Böhm and Pete Swenson

External links 
 Javier Martín Villa at skimountaineering.org
 Javier Martín de Villa, website of the FEDME

References 

1981 births
Living people
Spanish male ski mountaineers
Sportspeople from Madrid